Sidorovo is a rural locality (a village) in Andomskoye Rural Settlement, Vytegorsky District, Vologda Oblast, Russia. The population was 6 as of 2002.

Geography 
Sidorovo is located 34 km northeast of Vytegra (the district's administrative centre) by road. Perevoz is the nearest rural locality.

References 

Rural localities in Vytegorsky District